Calviac-en-Périgord (literally Calviac in Périgord) is a commune of the Dordogne department in Nouvelle-Aquitaine and is situated in southwest France.

Population

See also
Communes of the Dordogne department

References

Communes of Dordogne